Issi Baran (4 November 1927 – 25 April 2018) was a Finnish sprinter. He competed in the men's 100 metres at the 1952 Summer Olympics. As a Finnish Jew, Baran represented the Finnish Jewish sports club Makkabi Helsinki.

References

External links
 

1927 births
2018 deaths
Athletes (track and field) at the 1952 Summer Olympics
Finnish male sprinters
Olympic athletes of Finland
Athletes from Helsinki
Finnish Jews